Dąbie (formerly , Altdamm, or Stettin-Altdamm) is a former town and current municipal neighbourhood of the city of Szczecin in  Poland, situated on the Płonia river, on the south coast of Dąbie Lake, on the right bank of Oder river, east of the Szczecin Old Town and Middle Town. As of January 2011 it had a population of 13,275.

Dąbie name
The name of Dąbie is of Slavonic origin and comes from the words like dąb (English: Oak), dąbie, dębina (English: Oak Forest).
The early Latin documents show the name as: 1121 Vadam, 1174 Dam, 1157 Dambe, 1179 Damba, 1242 Dambe, 14th century Damnis, and in German documents as: Damn, later Alt Damn (old Dąbie). Before 1945 when Stettin was a part of Germany, the German name of this suburb was Stettin-Altdamm. In 1945 the Polish name was temporarily: Dąb, Dąb Stary and later fixed to Dąbie, based on the earliest documents.

History
In the early 10th century a settlement of the Pomeranians, destroyed in 1121 in the war between Bolesław III of Poland with the Pomeranians. The village was rebuilt and in 1176 it was awarded by duke Warcislaw II to the Cistercian monastery in Kołbacz. In the following years Dąbie became the bridgehead for Szczecin and main trading post for the rich Cistercian land properties.

In 1249 duke Barnim I established a ducal municipality next to the village, and granted it autonomy under Magdeburg rights in 1260, changed to Lübeck rights in 1293.

During World War II a POW camp was erected there. On 20 March 1945, Altdamm was captured by troops of the 1st Belorussian Front of the Red Army in the course of the East Pomeranian offensive. It became part of Poland in 1945 as a result of the Potsdam Agreement. Dąbie was eventually incorporated into Szczecin on 29 April 1948.

People 
 Friedrich Gilly (1772-1800), German architect
 Carl Teike (1864-1922), German composer
 Hilde Radusch (1903-1994), German political activist

Administrative divisions
 1249–1816 - separate town
 1816–1826 - part of Stettin City
 1826–1939 - separate town in Randow County
 1939–1945 - part of Stettin City
 1945–1948 - separate town in Gryfino County
 after 1948 - part of Szczecin City

References

Neighbourhoods of Szczecin